The occipital artery arises from the external carotid artery opposite the facial artery. Its path is below the posterior belly of digastric to the occipital region. This artery supplies blood to the back of the scalp and sternocleidomastoid muscles, and deep muscles in the back and neck.

Structure
At its origin, it is covered by the posterior belly of the digastricus and the stylohyoideus, and the hypoglossal nerve winds around it from behind forward; higher up, it crosses the internal carotid artery, the internal jugular vein, and the vagus and accessory nerves.

It next ascends to the interval between the transverse process of the atlas and the mastoid process of the temporal bone, and passes horizontally backward, grooving the surface of the latter bone, being covered by the sternocleidomastoideus, splenius capitis, longissimus capitis, and digastricus, and resting upon the rectus capitis lateralis, the obliquus superior, and semispinalis capitis.

It then changes its course and runs vertically upward, pierces the fascia connecting the cranial attachment of the trapezius with the sternocleidomastoideus, and ascends in a tortuous course in the superficial fascia of the scalp, where it divides into numerous branches, which reach as high as the vertex of the skull and anastomose with the posterior auricular and superficial temporal arteries.

Function
 Muscular branches: supply the digastric, stylohyoid, splenius, and longus capitis muscles.
 Sternocleidomastoid branch: This branch divides into upper and lower branches in the carotid triangle. The upper branch accompanies the accessory nerve to the sternocleidomastoid, and the lower branch arises near the origin of the occipital artery before entering the sternocleidomastoid muscle.  Occasionally, this branch arises directly from the external carotid artery.
 Auricular branch: supplies the back of the ear.  In many specimens, this branch gives rise to the mastoid branch, which supplies the dura mater, diploe, and mastoid air cells.  In other specimens, the mastoid artery is a branch of the occipital artery, rather than the auricular branch.
 Meningeal branch: supplies the dura mater in the posterior cranial fossa
 Descending branches: This is the largest branch.  It descends on the posterior aspect of the neck, and divides into a superficial and deep portion. The superficial portion supplies the trapezius muscle and anastomoses with the ascending branch of the transverse cervical.  The deep portion anastomoses with the vertebral artery and with the a. profunda cervicalis, a branch of the costocervical trunk. Thus, branches of the occipital artery participate in anastomosis between the external carotid and the subclavian artery, thereby providing collateral circulation.

Its terminal portion is accompanied by the greater occipital nerve.

Additional images

References

External links
 
 Diagram at stchas.edu
 http://www.dartmouth.edu/~humananatomy/figures/chapter_47/47-2.HTM

Arteries of the head and neck